Walking Wounded is the ninth studio album by British musical duo Everything but the Girl. It was released on 6 May 1996 by Atlantic Records in the United States and Virgin Records in Europe. The album saw the group adopting a more electronic and dance-based style, following the success of the remixed version of "Missing" from their previous album, Amplified Heart.

Four tracks from the album were released as singles, including the drum and bass-influenced "Walking Wounded" and the house-influenced "Wrong", which became top ten hits on the UK Singles Chart, as well as the downtempo track "Single", which set Tracey Thorn's emotionally direct vocal against breakbeats, organ and strings, and "Before Today".

Composition
According to Pitchforks Ruth Saxelby, Walking Wounded draws on downtempo, drum and bass and trip hop music, "compressing the wide open space of those then-nascent sounds into a pop format". AllMusic critic Stephen Thomas Erlewine wrote that the album was informed musically by trip hop and techno, albeit eschewing the "free-form song structures" traditionally associated with those genres. Treble writer Adam Blyweiss viewed it as a refinement of Everything but the Girl's earlier sophisti-pop sound that "replaced many of the duo's acoustics with reasonable digital facsimiles".

Walking Wounded marked a change in the duo's approach to writing songs. Ben Watt produced various instrumental tracks, while Tracey Thorn wrote lyrics after listening to the completed tracks. In producing the tracks, Watt utilised samples from sources such as Tim Buckley's "Song to the Siren" and Stan Tracey's "Starless and Bible Black". Thorn later recalled: "We really believed in ourselves and that comes across in the sound. We'd finally got to the point where we realised what our strength was: the softness and warmth of my voice against urban beats; the warm and cold, the soft and hard contrast. We got it perfect on this record; it was our pop triumph."

Release
Walking Wounded is the duo's highest-charting album to date, reaching number four in the United Kingdom and number 37 in the United States. By February 1997, it had sold 750,000 copies worldwide, according to Billboard. The album went on to sell over 1,300,000 copies worldwide.

The album's cover art is unusual in that it features the barcode on both the front and back of the album.

Walking Wounded was reissued by Edsel Records as a two-disc deluxe set on 4 September 2015. On 8 November 2019, the album was re-released on vinyl by Buzzin' Fly Records.

Critical reception

Walking Wounded was included in the book 1001 Albums You Must Hear Before You Die.

Track listing

Personnel
Credits for Walking Wounded adapted from liner notes.

Everything but the Girl
 Tracey Thorn – vocals
 Ben Watt – acoustic guitar, vocals, abstract sounds, beats, synthesizer, production, programming, recording

Production
 Andy Bradfield – mixing
 Mads Bjerke – engineering on "Walking Wounded"
 Spring Heel Jack – mixing, production and programming on "Walking Wounded"
 Howie B – co-production, programming and scratching on "Flipside"
 Johnny Rockstar – additional programming on "Flipside"
 Jeremy Shaw – additional programming on "Flipside"
 Matthius H. – engineering on "Wrong" (Todd Terry remix)
 Todd Terry – additional production and remixing on "Wrong" (Todd Terry remix)
 Rob Haigh – engineering, additional production and remixing on "Walking Wounded" (Omni Trio remix)

Design
 Everything but the Girl – design
 Jim Friedman – inner sleeve photography
 Form – design
 Marcelo Krasilcic – cover photography

Charts

Weekly charts

Year-end charts

Certifications

References

1996 albums
Atlantic Records albums
Everything but the Girl albums
Trip hop albums by English artists
Virgin Records albums
Dream pop albums by English artists
Drum and bass albums